Come To Salem is the fourth album by Dutch thrash metal band Dead Head, released in 2000.

Track listing

Personnel
Tom van Dijk - bass, vocals
Robbie Woning - guitar
Ronnie van der Wey - guitar
Hans Spijker - drums

References

Dead Head albums
2000 compilation albums
Thrash metal compilation albums